The main French Clubs Competition is called by Française Rink Hockey Nationale 1. It nowadays is disputed by 12 teams.
The Champion in the last edition of Nationale 1 was HC Dinan Quévert.

History

History after 1990

History between 1911 and 1989

Titles by club

External links
Fédération Française de Roller Skating (Section rink hockey)
Biggest website about Roller Hockey in French

Sports competitions in France
Roller hockey in France
France
Roller Hockey